

References
  — racemic
   — (D-aspartic acid)
  — (L-aspartic acid)
  — C(C(C(=O)O)N)[11C](=O)O
  — C(C(C(=O)O)[13NH2])C(=O)O

Chemical data pages
Chemical data pages cleanup